Seven hills may refer to:

Places
 Seven Hills, Colorado, US
 Seven Hills, Nevada, US
 Seven Hills, New South Wales, Australia
 Seven Hills railway station
 Seven Hills, Ohio, US
 Seven Hills, Queensland, Australia
 Seven Hills, U.S. Virgin Islands
 Seven hills of Constantinople
Seven hills of Shimla
 Seven hills of Iași
 Seven hills of Istanbul
 Seven hills of Moscow
 Seven hills of Rome
 Seven hills of San Francisco
 Seven hills of Seattle
 Seven Hills, a neighborhood in Aurora, Colorado, US
 Seven Hills Ski Park, also known as Point Woronzof Park, Alaska, US
 A nickname of Lynchburg, Virginia.

Other uses
 Seven Hills School, a private school in Cincinnati, Ohio, US
 Seven Hills (album), by Anthem

See also
 List of cities claimed to be built on seven hills
 Sevenhill, South Australia, Australia

 All pages with titles beginning with Seven hills
 All pages with titles containing Seven hills
 All pages with titles beginning with Seven Hills
 All pages with titles containing Seven Hills